Heartbeats is a 2017 romance-dance-dramedy written and directed by Step Up creator Duane Adler. The movie stars newcomers Krystal Ellsworth and Amitash Pradhan.

Cast
Krystal Ellsworth as Kelli
Daphne Zuniga
Justin Chon
Paul McGillion
Aneesha Joshi as Deepika
Amitash Pradhan as Aseem
Salman Yusuff Khan as pallav
Kishori Shahane
Mohan Kapur
Edan meshack from Kenya

Development
Duane Adler, music supervisor Joel C. High and producers Andrea Chung and Sriram Das teamed up with Roc Nation to create original music for the movie and the film's choreography.  Sony Music later acquired the soundtrack.

Chung studied abroad in India at NYU and was a fan of Adler's Save the Last Dance, in 2013 she approached Adler about developing a cross-over dance movie with Indian and American Contemporary musical and dance mash-up highlighting the celebration of the two cultures and discovered Adler too wanted to make a cross-cultural film.

Production
Principal photography began in India in January 2016.

Release
The film had a limited release in USA in January 2018 before being acquired by Amazon Prime for a Valentine's Day 2021 release.

The movie opened in the Top 15 box office in Germany, South Africa, Russia, Austria and Middle East.

The movie was at #2 most streamed for two weeks straight in the Romance category on Sky Cinema UK.

Wild Bunch released it in France on Netflix where the film developed a young fan base.

The movie released theatrically in Taiwan in September 2017 and Fox Movies Asia released in 2018 in rest of Southeast Asia.

German company Koch Media acquired the film for Italy and later released on Amazon Prime.

Reception
The movie became available on Amazon Prime Video on Valentine's Day 2021 and has garnered 4.3/5 rating out of 479 user reviews in the first 2 months.

References

External links
 
 

American comedy-drama films
Indian comedy-drama films
2017 films
Bowery Hills Entertainment films
2017 comedy-drama films
Films shot in India
2010s English-language films
2010s American films